Dmitry Yershov (born 15 January 1971) is a Russian short track speed skater. He competed in the men's 1000 metres event at the 1992 Winter Olympics.

References

1971 births
Living people
Russian male short track speed skaters
Olympic short track speed skaters of the Unified Team
Short track speed skaters at the 1992 Winter Olympics
Sportspeople from Nizhny Novgorod